Sadaf Mohammed Sayed, also known by her stage name Sadha, is an Indian actress who mainly appears in  Telugu, Tamil, and Kannada films. She was introduced to the Telugu film industry by the director Teja along with Nithiin in the film Jayam (2002), for which she was awarded Best Actress – Telugu.

Career
After making her debut in Jayam (2002), Sadha appeared in the Tamil film Anniyan (2005), opposite Vikram directed by S. Shankar. Since then, she has appeared in a number of films across various film industries of India, in different languages including Monalisa (2004) in Kannada and Click (2010) in Hindi.

In 2014, Sadha joined as a judge for the ninth season of Jodi No 1 on Vijay TV. In 2016, Sadha starred as judge in Dhee Juniors 1 & 2, a dance-based show produced by Mallemala Entertainments in Telugu. she is a judge on Dhee Jodi with Sekhar Master, with each season running over a period of one year. It is a weekly show that is broadcast on Wednesdays at 9:30 pm IST on ETV Telugu. She is known for her dressing style in the show.

She appeared in the films Eli in 2015 and Torchlight in 2018.

Other works

Sadha Sayed is an animal rights supporter, animal rescuer and a vegan. She supports the Federation of Indian Animal Protection Organisations (FIAPO) and has encouraged veganism.

Filmography

Film

Television
Dhee Juniors 1
Dhee Juniors 2
Dhee Jodi Special
Jodi Number One
Alitho Saradaga
Cash 2.0
Hello World (web series)
BB Jodi Telugu

See also
 List of vegans

References

External links
 

Living people
Marathi people
People from Ratnagiri district
Actresses from Mumbai
Indian film actresses
Actresses in Tamil cinema
Actresses in Kannada cinema
Filmfare Awards South winners
Actresses in Telugu cinema
Actresses in Malayalam cinema
Actresses in Hindi cinema
21st-century Indian actresses
Year of birth missing (living people)
Indian veganism activists